Catephia striata is a species of moth of the  family Erebidae. It is found in South Africa.

References

Endemic moths of South Africa
Catephia
Moths described in 1902
Moths of Africa